This is a list of the composition of the Congress of the Republic of Peru since the adoption of the current Constitution of Peru in 1993 starting with the 1995 elections.

Peruvian Congress of 1995–2000

On July 27, 1995 a new unicameral Congress was created with the following distribution by political party:

Change 90-New Majority (Alberto Fujimori): 67 seats
Union for Peru (Javier Pérez de Cuéllar): 17 seats
Peruvian Aprista Party (Mercedes Cabanillas): 8 seats
Independent Moralizing Front (Fernando Olivera): 6 seats
Democratic Convergence-Possible Country (Alejandro Toledo): 5 seats
Popular Action (Raúl Diez Canseco): 4 seats
Christian People's Party (Luis Bedoya Reyes): 3 seats
National Renovation (Rafael Rey): 3 seats
United Left (Agustín Haya de la Torre): 2 seats
OBRAS (Ricardo Belmont Cassinelli): 2 seats
FREPAP (Ezequiel Ataucusi Gamonal): 1 seat
National Front of Workers and Peasants (Roger Cáceres Velásquez): 1 seat
Agrarian Independent Movement (-): 1 seat

Peruvian Congress of 2000–2001

On July 27, 2000 the Congress of the Republic was established. This Congressional period was marked with various episodes of members of Congress switching their party affiliation. The following distribution marks seats by party at the end of the 2000-2001 term:

Peru 2000 (Alberto Fujimori): 52 seats
Peru Possible (Alejandro Toledo): 29 seats
Independent Moralizing Front (Fernando Olivera): 9 seats
Somos Perú: (Alberto Andrade) 8 seats
Peruvian Aprista Party: 6 seats
National Solidarity (Luis Castañeda) 5 seats
Avancemos (Federico Salas): 3 seats
Popular Action (Víctor Andrés García Belaúnde): 3 seats
Union for Peru (Máximo San Román: 3 seats
FREPAP: 1 seat

Peruvian Congress of 2001–2006 

On July 21, 2001 a new Congress of the Peruvian Republic was established the following is a distribution of Congress members by political party affiliation:

Peru Possible (Alejandro Toledo): 35 seats
Peruvian Aprista Party (Alan García): 28 seats
National Unity (Lourdes Flores): 12 seats
Independent Moralizing Front (Fernando Olivera): 7 seats
Somos Perú (Alberto Andrade): 6 seats
Other parties: 27 seats

Peruvian Congress of 2006–2011

A new Peruvian Congress of the Republic was established in July 2006 with the following distribution:

Union for Peru (Ollanta Humala): 45 seats.
Peruvian Aprista Party (Alan García): 36 seats.
National Unity (Lourdes Flores): 17 seats.
Alliance for the Future (Martha Chávez): 13 seats.
Center Front (Valentín Paniagua): 5 seats.
Possible Peru (Alejandro Toledo): 2 seats.
National Restoration (Humberto Lay): 2 seats.

Peruvian Congress of 2011–2016

Peru Wins (Ollanta Humala): 47 seats.
Force 2011 (Keiko Fujimori): 37 seats.
Possible Peru (Alejandro Toledo): 21 seats.
Alliance for the Great Change (Pedro Pablo Kuczynski): 12 seats.
Alliance National Solidarity (Luis Castañeda): 9 seats.
Peruvian Aprista Party (Alan Garcia): 4 seats.

Peruvian Congress of 2016–2020

Popular Force (Keiko Fujimori): 73 seats.
Broad Front (Verónika Mendoza): 20 seats.
Peruvians for Change (Pedro Pablo Kuczynski): 18 seats.
Alliance for Progress (César Acuña): 9 seats.
Popular Action (Alfredo Barnechea): 5 seats.
Peruvian Aprista Party (Alan García): 5 seats.

Peruvian Congress of 2020–2021

Popular Action: 25 seats
Alliance for Progress: 22 seats
FREPAP: 15 seats
Popular Force: 15 seats
Union for Peru: 13 seats
We Are Peru: 11 seats
Purple Party: 9 seats
Broad Front: 9 seats

Peruvian Congress of 2021–2026

Free Peru: 37
Popular Force: 24 seats
Popular Action: 16 seats
Alliance for Progress: 15 seats
Popular Renewal: 13 seats
Go on Country - Social Integration Party: 7 seats
Together for Peru: 5 seats
We Are Peru: 5 seats
Podemos Perú: 5 seats
Purple Party: 3 seats

Government of Peru
Peru history-related lists
Peru politics-related lists